Anjou–Louis-Riel is a provincial electoral district in Quebec, Canada that elects members to the National Assembly of Quebec. It is located in northern Montreal and consists of the entire Anjou borough of Montreal plus a part of the Mercier–Hochelaga-Maisonneuve borough.

The riding was created in 1972 under the name Anjou. For the 2012 election, it was renamed to Anjou–Louis-Riel, but its territory was unchanged.

Members of the National Assembly

Election results

Anjou–Louis-Riel, 2011–present

|}

|}

^ Change is from redistributed results. CAQ change is from ADQ.

Anjou, 1972–2011

References

External links
Information
 Elections Quebec

Election results
 Election results (National Assembly) (for Anjou)
 Election results (QuébecPolitique) (for Anjou)

Maps
 2011 map (PDF)
 2001 map for Anjou (Flash)
2001–2011 changes (Flash)
1992–2001 changes (Anjou) (Flash)
 Electoral map of Montréal region
 Quebec electoral map, 2011

Provincial electoral districts of Montreal
Quebec provincial electoral districts
Anjou, Quebec
Mercier–Hochelaga-Maisonneuve